"Torn to Pieces" is the third single by American rock band Pop Evil from Onyx, the third studio album from the ensemble.

"Torn to Pieces" was Pop Evil's third number-one hit on Billboard's Mainstream Rock chart, peaking for two weeks.

Background 
The tune deals with the loss of lead vocalist Leigh Kakaty's father.  Per a social media initiative started by the band, fans were asked to submit photos representing what the tune meant to them.  Regarding the song, lead vocalist Leigh Kakaty states "There’s nothing more haunting & torturous to the human soul than the feeling of losing someone close to you without saying goodbye".

Critical reception 
The Chattanooga Pulse states that the song is "destined for the type of hardwon ubiquity earned by “Last Man Standing,” “Monster You Made” and the Mick Mars collaboration “Boss's Daughter”" while Alessandra Donnelly of EOne Entertainment describes the tune as "a slow, brokenhearted ballad with a simple, catchy melody that flows into an emotional solo".
The Valley Beat goes on to say that "though they resemble the likes of one of their previous ballads, “Monster You Made”, they still have enough balls to fit right in on this record".

Music video 

The video was directed by Swedish director Johan Carlen.

Chart performance 
In a matter of just over a month, the song went from being No. 1 most added to No. 13 on Active Rock.

Certifications

References 

Pop Evil songs
2013 songs
2014 singles
Songs written by Dave Bassett (songwriter)
Song recordings produced by Johnny K
MNRK Music Group singles
2010s ballads
 Rock ballads